is a village located in Fukushima Prefecture, Japan. However, in March 2011, the entire population was evacuated as a result of the Fukushima Daiichi nuclear disaster. The evacuation order was lifted on June 12, 2016 for much of the  village; however, the actual number of residents who returned is considerably less than the official population numbers.

Geography

Surrounding municipalities
Fukushima Prefecture
Tamura
Nihonmatsu
Namie

Demographics
Per Japanese census data, the population of Katsurao was relatively constant over the past 40 years until the nuclear disaster.

Climate
Katsurao has a humid climate (Köppen climate classification Cfa).

History
The area of present-day Katsurao was part of Mutsu Province. The remains of Kofun period burial mounds have been found in the area. During the Nara period, it was part of ancient Futaba District in Iwaki Province. During the Edo period, it was part of Sōma Domain, ruled by the Sōma clan until the Meiji restoration. After the Meiji restoration, on April 1, 1889, the village of Katsurao was created within Futaba District, Fukushima with the establishment of the modern municipalities system on April 1, 1889.

2011 Fukushima Daiichi nuclear disaster

Although Katsurao escaped significant damage from the 2011 Tōhoku earthquake and tsunami, it was located downwind of the Fukushima Daiichi Nuclear Power Plant. Although outside the nominal  exclusion zone, as a result of wind patterns following the Fukushima Daiichi nuclear disaster, the entire population of the village was evacuated by government order by May 2011. In March 2013, the government divided the village into three zones, with the majority of the village area cleared for unrestricted return of its inhabitants by spring of 2014, a smaller area cleared for daylight return only, and a larger area in which the existing restrictions against entry would be maintained until at least 2017.
 However, in March 2014, the government postponed lifting of the restrictions on return for a year due to remaining high levels of radiation. On June 12, 2016, the evacuation order was lifted for approximately two-thirds of the village area, with the mountainous region bordering neighbouring Namie remaining restricted due to high residual radiation.

Economy
The economy of Katsurao was formerly heavily dependent on agriculture.

Education
Katsurao had one public elementary school and one public junior high school operated by the village government in March 2011. The elementary school remains closed. The village did not have a public high school.

Transportation

Railway
Katsurao is not served by any passenger train stations.

Highway

References

External links

Official Website 

 
Villages in Fukushima Prefecture